The Sense of Wonder (original title: Le Goût des merveilles) is a 2015 French romance film written and directed by Éric Besnard. It stars Virginie Efira and Benjamin Lavernhe.

Plot 
A widow with two young children discover a new lease of life after she nearly runs over a stranger with her car.

Cast 
 Virginie Efira as Louise Legrand
 Benjamin Lavernhe as Pierre
 Lucie Fagedet as Emma Legrand
 Léo Lorléac'h as Félix Legrand 
 Hervé Pierre as Jules
 Hiam Abbass as Dr. Mélanie Ferenza
 Laurent Bateau as Paul
 François Bureloup as bar owner

References

External links 
 

2015 films
2015 romance films
2010s French-language films
French romance films
Films about autism
Films directed by Éric Besnard
Films produced by Michel Seydoux
2010s French films